"All or Nothing" is a song by new wave band Fiction Factory, released in 1984 as the third and final single from the band's debut album, Throw the Warped Wheel Out. The song was written by Kevin Patterson, Eddie Jordan and Chic Medley. It was produced by Alan Rankine.

Background
After the early 1984 top 10 UK hit with "(Feels Like) Heaven", the follow-up, a reissue of debut single "Ghost of Love", only managed to reach No. 64 in the UK. The band became labelled as a one-hit wonder, as their following releases failed to reach commercial success. "All or Nothing" was released with little interest from record buyers, and it failed to make an appearance within the UK top 100. This was despite the song receiving acclaim from music journalists as a stand-out track from the band's debut album. The song was released with limited promotion, with the single not having a music video, unlike the previous two singles.

Release
The single was released via 7" and 12" vinyl in the UK. A 7" single was also issued in the Netherlands. All releases were through CBS Records, who also distributed the release. A promotional 7" vinyl was released in the UK as well.

The 7" vinyl featured the exclusive non-album B-Side "Dreaming of Someone" - a song written by Patterson and Jordan, and produced by Fiction Factory. The 12" vinyl release featured an "Extended Version" of "All or Nothing", along with "Dreaming of Someone" and another exclusive, non-album B-side, "I Who Know You". This song was also written by Patterson and Jordan, and produced by Fiction Factory. Peter Wilson, who produced the majority of the band's debut album, mixed the track.

The single featured a full colour sleeve, featuring similar artwork as the band's debut album - a close up of Patterson in silhouette, with a glowing effect amongst a black backdrop. The photography was taken by David McIntyre in his own parent's garden. The effect was achieved by McIntyre drawing Patterson's outline on a piece of cardboard. A couple of days later they then took a camera, the exposure and the cardboard outline to a local place called "The Hermitage" - close to Perth - where Europe's tallest tree stands. The cardboard piece was positioned close to the tree, and then McIntyre did the second part of the exposure while walking about with a torch doing all the lights off Patterson.

Following the song's release on the Throw the Warped Wheel Out album, and as a single, the song would later appear on the band's only compilation album Feels Like Heaven, released in Europe during 1999 via Sony Music Entertainment. "I Who Know You" would also appear on the compilation.

Track listings
7" single
"All or Nothing" - 3:49
"Dreaming of Someone" - 3:32

12" single
"All or Nothing" (Extended Version) - 4:58
"Dreaming of Someone" - 3:27
"I Who Know You" - 4:34

Critical reception
On its release as a single, Jerry Smith of Music Week described it as "slick pop" and wrote, "This has a commercial sound, with its funky bass and very Martin Fry type vocals punctuated by an intricate keyboard arrangement." Karen Swayne of Record Mirror described it as "another offering from one of the most anonymous of the recent crop of faceless bands cluttering up the charts". She added, "I blame it on Radio One for encouraging thme. As long as this kind of bland synthesised music is deemed ideal airplay fodder, there'll always be Fiction Factories churning it out." In a retrospective review of Throw the Warped Wheel Out, Michael Sutton of AllMusic said, "The slow groove of 'The Hanging Gardens' or the brisk, soulful melodies of 'All or Nothing' may not have the instant appeal of '(Feels Like) Heaven', but repeated spins uncover the finger-snapping hooks within."

Personnel
 Kevin Patterson - vocals
 Chic Medley - guitar
 Graham McGregor - bass
 Eddie Jordan - keyboards
 Mike Ogletree - drums and percussion

Production
 Producer of "All or Nothing" - Alan Rankine
 Remixers of "All or Nothing" - Fiction Factory
 Producer of "Dreaming of Someone" and "I Who Know You" - Fiction Factory
 Mixing of "I Who Know You" - Peter Wilson
 Photography - David McIntyre

Charts

References

1984 songs
1984 singles
Fiction Factory songs
CBS Records singles